Semenogelin-1 is a protein that in humans is encoded by the SEMG1 gene.
The protein encoded by this gene is the predominant protein in semen. The encoded secreted protein is involved in the formation of a gel matrix that encases ejaculated spermatozoa. The prostate-specific antigen (PSA) protease processes this protein into smaller peptides, with each possibly having a separate function. The proteolysis process breaks down the gel matrix and allows the spermatozoa to move more freely. Two transcript variants encoding different isoforms have been found for this gene.

See also
Semenogelin

References

Further reading